Bruce Frederick Cummings, (March 1927 – June 16, 1991) was an award-winning, all-star and Grey Cup champion Canadian football player with the Ottawa Rough Riders, playing from 1950 to 53.

Born in Ottawa and a star football player at the University of Toronto, Cummings joined his hometown Riders in 1950. Though his career was relatively brief, he enjoyed a complete season in 1951, being named an all-star, winning the Jeff Russel Memorial Trophy as the best player in the Interprovincial Rugby Football Union and hoisting the Grey Cup as champion.

His father, W. Garfield Cummings, was a local politician and former Ottawa footballer. Bruce Cummings died at the age of 64 in 1991 following a heart attack.

References 

1927 births
Ottawa Rough Riders players
Toronto Varsity Blues football players
University of Toronto alumni
1991 deaths
Canadian football people from Ottawa
Players of Canadian football from Ontario